Grey North was a federal electoral district represented in the House of Commons of Canada from 1867 to 1968. It was located in the province of Ontario. It was created by the British North America Act of 1867, which divided the County of Grey into two ridings: Grey South and Grey North. The North Riding consisted of the Townships of Collingwood, Euphrasia, Holland, Saint-Vincent, Sydenham, Sullivan, Derby, and Keppel, Sarawak and Brooke, and the Town of Owen Sound.

In 1872, the County of Grey was divided into three ridings when Grey East was created. The North Riding consisted of the Townships of Holland, Sullivan, Sydenham, Derby, Sarawak, Keppel and the Town of Owen Sound.

In 1903, the Townships of Holland and Sullivan were excluded from the riding, and the townships of Keppel and St. Vincent and the town of Meaford were incorporated into the riding.

In 1914, the county of Grey was again divided into two ridings. The north riding consisted of the towns of Owen Sound, Meaford and Thornbury, and the townships of Sydenham, Keppel, Derby, Sarawak, St. Vincent, Collingwood and Euphrasia.

In 1924, the riding was redefined as consisting of the part of the county of Grey lying north of and including the townships of Derby, Sydenham, Euphrasia, and the town of Collingwood.

In 1933, the riding was redefined as consisting of the part of the county of Grey contained in the townships of Collingwood, Derby, Euphrasia, Holland, Keppel, Osprey, St. Vincent and Sydenham, and including the city of Owen Sound.

In 1947, the riding was redefined to include the township of Sarawak and Sydenham, and excluding the village of Chatsworth.

The electoral district was abolished in 1966 when it was redistributed between Bruce and Grey—Simcoe ridings.

Members of Parliament

This riding elected the following members of the House of Commons of Canada:

Election results

|}

|}

|}

|}

|}

|}

|}

On Mr. Clark's death, 27 July 1896, before the opening of the 9th Parliament:

|}

|}

On Mr. Horsey's death, 23 July 1902:

|}

|}

|}

|}

|}

|}

|}

|}

|}

 

|}

|}

On Mr. Telford's resignation, 9 December 1944, to provide a vacancy for A.G.L. McNaughton:

|}

|}

|}

|}

|}

|}

|}

|}

|}

See also 

 List of Canadian federal electoral districts
 Past Canadian electoral districts

References

External links 
Riding history from the Library of Parliament

Former federal electoral districts of Ontario